
Fabrica de Aviones Anahuac was an aircraft manufacturer founded in Mexico in 1966 to develop and produce an agricultural aircraft, the Tauro.

Aircraft
Anahuac Tauro

References
 
 

Aircraft manufacturers of Mexico
Defunct manufacturing companies of Mexico